Plainville is a hamlet on NY Route 370, approximately 4.5 miles west of Baldwinsville in Onondaga County, New York, United States.

It is noted for the extensive Plainville Turkey Farms, which remained in the same family from 1835 until the business was sold in 2007 to Hain Celestial Group. The former Plainville turkey processing operations were relocated to Pennsylvania in 2009, and the Plainville  plant was shut down in 2010.

On Route 370, west of the hamlet, is the James Leslie Voorhees house, Whig Hill (1833), one of the major historic houses of Onondaga County.  Voorhees was a wealthy landowner of nearby property and a builder of New York City as well as Central New York engineering projects who was active in New York State politics.

Whig Hill and Dependencies was listed on the National Register of Historic Places in 1990.

References

 McKee, Harley J., Patricia Earle, Paul Malo.  Architecture Worth Saving in Onondaga County.  Syracuse University Press, 1964.
 Onondaga Landmarks:  A Survey of Historic and Architectural Sites in Syracuse and Onondaga County.  Syracuse-Onondaga County Planning Agency, 1987

External links

 Plainville Farms history
 

Hamlets in New York (state)
Syracuse metropolitan area
Hamlets in Onondaga County, New York